The 1934 United States Senate election in Ohio took place on November 6, 1934. Incumbent Republican Senator Simeon Fess ran for a third term in office, but was defeated by Democratic former Governor of Ohio Vic Donahey in a landslide.

Democratic primary

Candidates
A. Victor Donahey, former Governor of Ohio (1923–29)
Charles F. West, U.S. Representative from Granville
George White, incumbent Governor of Ohio

Results

General election

Results

See also 
 1934 United States Senate elections

References

Ohio
1934
1934 Ohio elections